The 2013  Tour Cycliste Féminin International de l'Ardèche will be a women's cycle stage race held in France. The tour will be held from 2 September to 5 September, 2013. The tour has an UCI rating of 2.2.

Stages

Prologue
2 September Vallon Pont d'Arc to Vallon Pont d'Arc

Stage 1
3 September Rochegude to Beauchastel

Stage 2 (ITT)
4 September Vals-les-Bains to Vals-les-Bains

Stage 3
4 September Vals-les-Bains to Le Teil

Stage 4
5 September Le Pouzin to Cruas

Stage 5
6 September

Stage 6
7 September

Classification leadership

References

External links

International cycle races hosted by France
2013 in women's road cycling
2013 in French sport